Royal Air Force Ballykelly or more simply RAF Ballykelly is a former Royal Air Force station which opened in 1941 in Ballykelly, County Londonderry. It closed in 1971 when the site was handed over to the British Army as Shackleton Barracks. A small part of the base has been used as a refuelling point by army helicopters and small fixed-wing aircraft usually operating out of Joint Helicopter Command Flying Station Aldergrove near the town of Antrim.

Second World War
RAF Ballykelly opened in June 1941 during the Second World War as an airfield for RAF Coastal Command. In 1943, the main runway was extended and acquired an unusual characteristic in that it crossed an active railway line. Rules were put in place giving trains the right of way over landing aircraft.

Post-war
The airfield was closed at the end of the Second World War, but re-opened in 1947 as the home of the Joint Anti-Submarine School RAF, a training flight flying Avro Shackleton aircraft, which had formed at Londonderry on 19 September 1945.

In 1955, RAF Ballykelly was home to three squadrons of Shackletons, 204 Squadron, 240 Squadron and 269 Squadron. These were housed in T2 hangars in the dispersal areas and serviced in the huge Ballykelly Cantilever Hangar which was more than 700 feet wide and 130 feet deep. There was also a station flight with two Lockheed Hudsons, two Douglas Dakotas and an Auster. In 1957 and again in 1958, 240 Squadron was among those involved in Operation Grapple, nuclear weapon testing on Christmas Island in the Pacific Ocean.

By 1959, 240 and 269 Squadrons had been renumbered as 203 Squadron and 210 Squadron. The three Squadrons were part of the ASW (Anti-Submarine Warfare) force. They also covered search and rescue (SAR) standby duties together with their counterparts at RAF Kinloss and RAF St. Mawgan.

Some Royal Navy Fleet Air Arm units including 819 Squadron moved onto the station in 1962 and the navy referred to it as HMS Sealion or RNAS Ballykelly. The main runway (the one which crossed the railway) was extended again in 1963 to 7,500 feet to allow for potential dispersal of the RAF's V bomber force. This included the addition of V-bomber Operational Readiness Platforms at the eastern end. In April 1968, 204 Squadron flying from Ballykelly suffered the loss of an RAF Shackleton. Sqn Ldr Clive Haggett and his crew, a total of 12 men, were killed when their aircraft flew into the Mull of Kintyre early one rainy morning.

During a transatlantic yacht race in 1967/8 a French competitor was lost. One of the Shackletons from Ballykelly found him by adopting search positions well before the expected search location. They dropped life preserving equipment to him and marked his position to enable pick up by surface vessels.

The last of the Shackleton aircraft left RAF Ballykelly on 31 March 1971, the airfield closed and the site was handed over to the British Army as Shackleton Barracks on 2 June 1971.

The following units were here at some point:

 Units

 Army Air Corps

 Fleet Air Arm

Recent incidents
On 29 March 2006, an Airbus A320 aircraft operated by Eirjet on behalf of Ryanair landed at Ballykelly after the pilot mistook the runway for that of nearby City of Derry Airport. The 39 passengers who boarded the flight at Liverpool John Lennon Airport continued their journey to the airport by bus.

See also 
List of air stations of the Royal Navy
List of former Royal Air Force stations

References

Citations

Bibliography

External links
Location Map
Ballykelly's Shackleton Era 1952-1971

Buildings and structures in County Londonderry
Military history of County Londonderry
Ballykelly